Tangled Fortunes is a 1932 American Western film directed by J.P. McGowan and starring Buzz Barton, Francis X. Bushman Jr. and Caryl Lincoln.

Cast
 Buzz Barton as Buzz Davis 
 Francis X. Bushman Jr. as Jim Collins 
 Caryl Lincoln as Sally Martin 
 Edmund Cobb as Buck Logan 
 Charles Herzinger as Andy Wiggins 
 Frank Ball as John (Pap) Davis 
 Francis Ford as Matt Higgins 
 Jack Long as Lefty 
 C.V. Bussey as Chris 
 Ezelle Poule as Betty

References

Bibliography
 Michael R. Pitts. Poverty Row Studios, 1929–1940: An Illustrated History of 55 Independent Film Companies, with a Filmography for Each. McFarland & Company, 2005.

External links
 

1932 films
1932 Western (genre) films
American Western (genre) films
Films directed by J. P. McGowan
1930s English-language films
1930s American films